Robert de Houdetot  was a French admiral and nobleman.

Biography
Robert was a son of Richard II de Houdetot. After the disastrous defeat of the French fleet at Sluys, Flanders, he was appointed an Admiral of France in 1340 and undertook retaliatory raids against English shipping.

He was seneschal of the Agenais and master-bowman in 1345 and laid siege to Casseneuil during 1345. While undertaking a siege of the château at Bajamont in 1346 he was taken prisoner. Robert was known as the grand master of the king's crossbows in 1352.

Citations

References
 

Year of birth unknown
Year of death unknown
14th-century French people
French soldiers
14th-century military history of France
Place of birth missing
Lords of France